Joanne Claybon Benson (born March 11, 1941) is an American politician who represents District 24 in the Maryland State Senate. She formerly represented District 24 in the Maryland House of Delegates

Early life and education
Benson was born on March 11, 1941, in Roanoke, Virginia. She attended South Hagerstown High School and then graduated from Bowie State College with a Bachelor of Science in education in 1961. She later attended The Catholic University of America where she earned her Master of Arts in curriculum instruction in 1972.

In the legislature
Benson was a member of House of Delegates from 1991 to 2011. She served on the House Health and Government Operations Committee and its health occupations subcommittee, long-term care subcommittee, and its minority health disparities subcommittee. She is also a member and former chair of the Legislative Black Caucus of Maryland. She still presides at the Caucus meetings, providing an inspirational prayer as the Caucus' chaplain.

In 2010 she defeated incumbent state senator Nathaniel Exum and was sworn into office in January 2011. In 2020 she was selected to be the Senate's Deputy Majority leader and has been chairman of the Senate Rules committee since 2019.

In 2019, Benson worked with Colorado Governor John Hickenlooper to commute the sentence of Curtis Brooks, who had been sentenced as a juvenile to life in prison without parole.

Political positions

Gun control
During the 2019 legislative session, Benson introduced legislation to ban the manufacture or sale of ghost guns.

Marijuana
In 2022, Benson voted against legislation to legalize recreational marijuana in Maryland. She also voted against a bill to place a referendum legalizing recreational marijuana on the 2022 ballot.

Minimum wage
In 2019, Benson voted in favor of legislation to raise the state's minimum wage to $15 an hour, but expressed disappointment with the date's effective date of 2025.

Social issues
In 1991, Benson voted in favor of legislation to protect the right to abortion in Maryland.

Benson opposed the Religious Freedom and Civil Marriage Protection Act, a bill introduced in 2011 to legalize same-sex marriage in Maryland, saying that she did not view gay marriage as a civil rights issue. Although she was absent for the vote on the bill, she said she would have voted against it. In 2012, she voted against the Civil Marriage Protection Act.

In 2022, Benson supported legislation to provide paid family leave to all Maryland workers, saying that paid family leave "should not be viewed as a privilege, but as something that is humane and just".

Taxes
In 2013, Benson voted in favor of legislation to raise fuel taxes in Maryland.

Transportation
During the 2021 legislative session, Benson introduced legislation to hold the Maryland Department of Transportation to promises it made for the widening of Capital Beltway and Interstate 270 and modernizing the American Legion Memorial Bridge. The bill passed the House of Delegates by a vote of 101-35 in March, but did not receive a vote in the Senate.

Electoral history

References

Democratic Party members of the Maryland House of Delegates
African-American state legislators in Maryland
African-American women in politics
1941 births
Living people
Catholic University of America alumni
Women state legislators in Maryland
Politicians from Roanoke, Virginia
Democratic Party Maryland state senators
Bowie State University alumni
People from Hyattsville, Maryland
21st-century American politicians
21st-century American women politicians
21st-century African-American women
21st-century African-American politicians
20th-century African-American people
20th-century African-American women